Death of a President is a 1977 Polish drama film directed by Jerzy Kawalerowicz. It was entered into the 28th Berlin International Film Festival, where it won the Silver Bear for an outstanding artistic contribution. The film was also selected as the Polish entry for the Best Foreign Language Film at the 51st Academy Awards, but was not accepted as a nominee.

The film depicts the 1922 assassination of the first President of Poland Gabriel Narutowicz by artist and Endecja sympathizer Eligiusz Niewiadomski.

Cast
 Zdzisław Mrożewski as president Gabriel Narutowicz
 Marek Walczewski as painter Eligiusz Niewiadomski
 Henryk Bista as priest Marceli Nowakowski
 Czesław Byszewski as Prime Minister Julian Nowak
 Jerzy Duszyński as marshall Józef Piłsudski
 Edmund Fetting as general Józef Haller
 Kazimierz Iwor as Herman Lieberman
 Julian Jabczyński as count Stefan Przezdziecki
 Zbigniew Kryński as Stanisław Thugutt
 Leszek Kubanek as Norbert Barlicki
 Włodzimierz Saar as Stanisław Stroński
 Jerzy Sagan as Wincenty Witos
 Janusz Sykutera as Stanisław Car
 Tomasz Zaliwski as Maciej Rataj
 Teodor Gendera as Marian Zyndram-Kościałkowski

See also
 List of submissions to the 51st Academy Awards for Best Foreign Language Film
 List of Polish submissions for the Academy Award for Best Foreign Language Film

References

External links
 

1977 films
1977 drama films
1970s political drama films
1970s historical drama films
Polish historical drama films
1970s Polish-language films
Films based on actual events
Films set in Warsaw
Films directed by Jerzy Kawalerowicz
Silver Bear for outstanding artistic contribution